Asaluyeh (also Romanized as 'Asalūyeh; also known as Asalu, and sometimes prefixed by Bandar, meaning port) is a city in the Central District of Asaluyeh County, Bushehr province, Iran, and serves as capital of the county. At the 2006 census, its population was 4,746 in 875 households. The following census in 2011 counted 7,884 people in 1,709 households. The latest census in 2016 showed a population of 13,557 people in 3,324 households. Alternate spellings include: Assalouyeh, Asalouyeh, Asaloyeh, Asalooyeh, Asaluye, Assaluyeh, and Asalu. UNCTAD codes: IR YEH, IR PGU, and IR ASA.

Located on the shore of the Persian Gulf some 270 km SE of the provincial capital of Bushehr, it is best known as the site for the land based facilities of the huge PSEEZ (Pars Special Energy Economic Zone) project. The town itself is of minor significance, although it is common practice to refer to PSEEZ (established 1998) and Asaluyeh town collectively as Asaluyeh.

Asalouyeh was chosen as the site of the PSEEZ facilities due to it being the closest land point to the largest natural gas field in the world, the South Pars / North Dome Gas-Condensate field. In addition, an existing airport and direct access to international waters via a deep water port were already present.

PSEEZ

The PSEEZ (Pars Special Energy/Economic Zone) as it is known has been allocated 100 square kilometres of land at Asaluyeh for the various complexes and facilities. The site is a collection of different plants and refineries (known as "phases") and is administered by the PSEEZ agency onsite .

A total of 27 phases are envisaged (12 gas, 15 petrochemical), plus a mix of light and heavy industry, and associated support facilities such as factories and warehouses. The scale of the project is huge. Some 28 refineries and 25 petrochemical complexes are scheduled to be established in Asalouyeh, in southern Bushehr province. Of these, 10 refineries and 7 petrochemical complexes were already operational in 2009.

PSEEZ is a workers town – tourism is non-existent. Currently there are no hotels in Assalouyeh, although plans exist to construct a hotel between the airport and the Industrial area. Once completed, the Sadaf International Hotel will consist of 400 rooms in three buildings, on 1 square kilometre of land. A visa is required to enter Iran for most nationalities, and is therefore needed to visit the PSEEZ. The only exception to the visa requirement is if you visit Kish Island, which allows visitors to enter visa-free.

As of August 2005, US$20 billion of foreign money had been invested in PSEEZ since 1997. According to Iran's oil ministry, sales of products from PSEEZ could be as much as $11 billion per year, over 30 years.

Private companies are also constructing a business park and warehouses.

Internet access and telephony facilities are also available via a Tehran based Internet Service Provider, Pars Online. No other ISP's are present at PSEEZ.
In 2010, a large power plant with 1,000 megawatts output was inaugurated in Asalouyeh, aiming to supply electricity to the refineries of South Pars gas field phases 9, 10, 15, 16, 17, and 18.

Special economic zone

The Pars Special Economic Energy Zone (PSEEZ) is a special economic zone. PSEEZ was established in 1998 for the utilization of South Pars oil and gas resources. Goods can be brought in duty-free, but cannot leave the PSEEZ and enter the rest of Iran. This is to encourage construction within and development of the PSEEZ. The private sector has invested some $1.5 billion in the PSEEZ during the past 4 years (2009). Foreign entities have invested some $36 billion in the Pars Special Economic Energy Zone (PSEEZ) during the past 10 years (2009).

Asalouyeh City

Asalouyeh city is surrounded by PSEEZ, but is still geographically separate and a few minutes drive from the nearest PSEEZ facility. Before the arrival of PSEEZ, the primary industry was fishing, albeit a very small one. Asalouyeh was a sleepy coastal hamlet, on a narrow strip of land between the Persian Gulf and the Zagros Mountains. Poverty existed in the small town, and it remains. Today it is the most knows akak shops. In 2006 part of the town's seafront was given a promenade with some landscaping and decoration.

Construction

The PSEEZ is one of the busiest ongoing construction sites in the world. At any one time up to 60,000 workers are onsite, mostly employed in construction of further gas and petrochemical refineries.

Airport

Construction of a new airport began in 2003. The new Persian Gulf International Airport (IATA code: YEH) opened to traffic in July 2006, replacing the original temporary airport. The volume of construction works for facilities such as runways and aircraft parking area, fence, and patrol roads and access routes to the airport's boulevard, construction of terminals with Jetways to handle 750,000 passengers per year. Control tower and technical buildings as well as supporting buildings such as fire station, meteorology section and so on have been started. Airport characteristics are the runway with length of 4000 meters asphalt paved, width of 45 meters with two 7.5m shoulders along the runway. Aircraft parking area is 330 × 150 Sqm concrete paved. Airport area and peripheral buildings will be constructed on 18 hectares of land. Iranian specialists are undertaking execution works for this airport and installation of the airport's navigation and lighting systems will be performed by foreign companies.

Pars-Port Complex

Logistic Port: 
Logistic port covers 150 hectares: The western breakwater is 2300 meters long and the eastern breakwater is 1000 meters long. The port basin is 100 hectares with capacity to accept ships of up to 80,000 tons deadweight. The nominal capacity of this port is 10 million tons per year including 1 million tons of granulated sulphur, 3 million of container products and 6 million tons of refinery machinery and parts. 
This port will have at least 10 berths that can simultaneously accommodate 10 ships and especially for exporting of sulphur, containers loading / unloading as heavy cargo. Water drought along the berths is at least 11 meters and at most 15 meters and the jetty in this port is 2600 meters long. 
At present, 5 berths are operational. All of the equipment needed by refineries and petrochemical industries were unloaded in this very port and installed on sites.  
Petrochemical Port:  
The petrochemical port with 15 berths and draught of 15 meters can accommodate ships of capacity 80,000 tons deadweight that especially carry gas and petrochemical products. The nominal capacity of this port is 35 million tons per year and it is predicted that 26 million tons of petrochemical products in liquid from will be exported through this port. 
In accordance with the operations time schedule for the Zone's petrochemical projects, execution operations on this port will be completed in three phases; phase 1 will be completed by 2005 and the project's completion date will be year 2006.

Plants and Refineries

Each of the phases of the South Pars project is estimated to have an average capital spend of around US$1.5bn, and most will be led by foreign oil firms working in partnership with local companies. The government of President Ahmadinejad, who came to power in 2005, has favoured local firms over foreign companies in the energy and other sectors. In 2010, Iran awarded $21 billion of contracts to local companies to develop six stages (phases 13, 14, 19, 22, 23 and 24) of the South Pars gas field. Khatam al-Anbiya Construction Headquarters, the engineering arm of the Revolutionary Guard Corps, is part of the domestic group, as is Oil Industries Engineering and Construction and Iran Marine Industrial Co. The group also includes Iran Shipbuilding and Offshore Industries Complex Co., Industrial Development and Renovation Organization of Iran, and National Iranian Drilling Co. Managing the projects by Iranian companies does not rule out the participation of foreign firms in South Pars projects.
 
Any visitor to Asaluyeh will immediately notice the series of Gas and Petrochemical complexes running along the coast, one of the largest collection of such facilities in the world. The various plants and complexes currently run for some 12 km, and more are being constructed. A series of gas flares which line the facility are immediately obvious, including one enormous flare in particular, with flames of almost 100 m in height. This flare is visible far out to sea. The area also hosts the world's largest aromatic production plant, Noori Petrochemical Complex, with an annual capacity of 4.2 million tons. Once completed, South Pars development revenue will exceed current oil exports incomes.

Gas production at South Pars rose by nearly 30 per cent between March 2009 and March 2010. Production at South Pars gas field will rise to 175 million cubic meters per day in 2012.

Project phases

It came online in March 2003.
Phases 6 to 8 being developed by Petropars and Statoil to produce lean gas for re-injection into the Aghajari oilfield, and heavy gas and condensate for export. It involves construction of three offshore platforms in addition to the land-based facilities. Statoil is developing the offshore platforms while Petropars is developing the land based facilities. A 31-inch (790 mm) pipe will be laid from each platform to the coast.
Phases 9 and 10 was assigned to a consortium of Oil Industrial Engineering and Construction Company (OIEC) and LG Company. Phases 9 & 10 were inaugurated by President Ahmadinejad in March 2009.
Phases 11 will produce LNG through the Pars LNG project. The project was awarded to China National Petroleum Corporation in 2010 after that France's Total S.A. was excluded from the project by Iran.
Phases 12 development begin carried out by Petropars as a LNG project. Venezuela's state-owned oil company Petroleos de Venezuela S.A. (PDVSA) will finance 10 percent of the 7.8-billion-dollar project. Angola's Sonangol Group has also been awarded a 20 percent stake in phase 12 project. 
Phase 13 and 14 development will be for Persian LNG production. Development was awarded to an Iranian company (Khatam-ol-Osea) for $5 billion. The Iranian Khatam-ol-Osea Consortium is made up of several large Iranian companies, namely Khatam al-Anbia Construction Headquarters, Oil Industries Engineering & Construction (OIEC), SADRA, ISOICO, IDRO, and NIDC. The contract to develop phase 13 was signed with a consortium comprising Mapna, SADRA, and Petro Pidar Iranian companies and the phase 14 with another consortia consisting of Industrial Development and Renovation Organization (IDRO), National Iranian Drilling Company (NIDC) and Iranian Offshore Engineering and Construction Company (IOEC). Royal Dutch Shell and Repsol had been originally awarded phases 13 and 14 but were left out of the project by Iran due to their repeated delays.
Phases 15 and 16 development was awarded to Khatam al-Anbia. In July 2010, the project was transferred to Iran Shipbuilding & Offshore Industries Complex. At that time, the 2 billion dollars project was already 50% complete. Phase 15 & 16 will be completed by March 2012.
Phases 17 and 18 development was assigned to a consortium of Industrial Project Management of Iran (IPMI), Oil Industrial Engineering and Construction Company (OIEC), Iran Offshore Engineering and Construction (IOEC) and Petropars. Phase 17 & 18 will be completed by March 2012.
Phase 19 development was awarded to IOEC and Petropars. As it is understood, this phase is defined within phase 1, so it can be regarded as some kind of expansion for phase 1.
Phases 20 and 21 development was awarded to OIEC. In May 2008, Repsol and Royal Dutch Shell agreed to exchange block 13 with block 20 or 21 
Phases 22, 23 and 24 were awarded to Khatam al-Anbia, Petro Sina Arian, and SADRA and are located in the north-eastern frontier of the field. The aim of phases 22, 23 and 24 development is to produce 42.5 million cubic meters of natural gas,  of gas condensate and 300 tons of sulfur per day. The three phases also are designed to produce 800 thousands of LNG and 750 thousand tons of ethane per year.
Phases 25 and 26 are in tender.
Phases 27 and 28 development was assigned to Petropars on an EPC scheme.

South Pars Gas Field

The field is located in the Persian Gulf.

The South Pars Field is the name of northern part, which is located in Iranian waters and the North Dome is the name of southern part, which is located in Qatari waters. South Pars Field was discovered in 1990 by NIOC.

The field consists of two independent gas-bearing formations, Kangan and Upper Dalan. Each formation is divided into two different reservoir layers, separated by impermeable barriers. Therefore, the field consists of four independent reservoir layers K1, K2, K3, and K4.

The Iranian side accounts for 10% of the world's and 60% of Iran's total gas reserves.

The field is planned to be developed in around 30 phases, each of which will require an initial investment of around $1bn.

Downstream Industries

Due to the availability of Petrochemicals and their by-products, 10 square kilometres at PSEEZ has been allocated for related industries, such as:
 Resins & Adhesives
 Rubber & Plastics
 Synthetic fibers & textiles
 Oils
 Fertilizers
 Polymers
 Paints & Protective Coatings
 Pesticides
 Detergents

Water supply project

Construction of two water desalination plants each with a capacity of 10,000 cubic per day started in March 2005. The project was finished 10 months ahead of its contractual 16 months estimate, making it a landmark in project execution in the region.  
The creation of a network for transferring water distribution network in different sites is underway.

Green space and environment

In view of the Zone's policy on environmental protection and alleviation of industrial pollutions, first steps have been taken in the form of 1000 hectares of urban green space and 3000 hectares allocated to forestation and expansion of the mangrove trees in the tidal area of the sea. In this way, 10% of the total industrial site and 28% of the entire Zone will be transformed into green space.

Foreign involvement

Individual gas and petrochemical plants at Asoluyeh, when constructed, usually involve a partnership with a foreign company. The government of President Ahmadinejad, who came to power in 2005, has favoured local firms over foreign companies in the energy and other sectors. Due to the embargo in place against Iran by the United States, it is mostly European and Asian companies becoming involved.

These include:
 China National Petroleum Corporation
 Daelim
 Eni (formerly known as Agip)
 Gazprom
 Hyundai Engineering and Construction (with Linde Group)
 Japan Gasoline Company (JGC) – involved in the construction of the world's largest gas refinery.
 LG
 Petronas
 Statoil
 Technip
 Total
 Toyo Engineering Corporation (TEC)

However, the US company Halliburton and American Allied International Corporation, have contracts for and business dealing with South Pars via subsidiaries.

Plans for LNG refining and export have been discussed – but it remains to be seen how this will be accomplished, as most LNG refining technology is US based and therefore subject to export control due to US sanctions.

See also

Ministry of Petroleum of Iran
National Iranian Gas Company
National Iranian Oil Company
National Iranian Petrochemical Company
Asalouyeh Airport
South Pars / North Dome Gas-Condensate field
Economy of Iran
List of natural gas fields
International rankings of Iran

References

External links 

Pars Special Economic Energy Zone company
Iran Asalouyeh Official Website
Iran Asalouyeh Official Website
PSEEZ Official Site  
Port and Shipping Authority of Asaluyeh
Pars Business Park
Pars Industrial Warehouses
Pars Online ISP at Asalouyeh
US Department of the Treasury – Information and Guidelines on Trade Sanctions against Iran
Iran – Persian Gulf, Asalouyeh – Southern Pars Flickr
Pars Special Economic Energy Zone company
Iran Daily
Oil, Gas and Petrochemical Industries Forum
ایران عسلویه(Oil , Gas and Petrochemical Directory)

Populated places in Asaluyeh County
Cities in Bushehr Province
Economy of Iran
Energy in Iran
Port cities and towns of the Persian Gulf
Port cities and towns in Iran